Isabel Gemio Cardoso (born January 5, 1961 in Alburquerque, Badajoz) is a Spanish journalist and radio and television presenter. She was married to a Cuban sculptor (Julio Nilo Manrique Roldán) and has a biological son and an adopted son.

She started in Radio Extremadura, and later in Radio Barcelona as Isabel Garbí. Her debut in television was in 1983 with the TVE quiz show Los Sabios.

Prizes

 TP de Oro (1994) Best Conductor, Lo que necesitas es amor.
 TP de Oro (1996) Best Conductor, Sorpresa ¡Sorpresa!.
 Garbanzo de Plata (1996).
 Micrófono de Plata (2005), Te doy mi palabra.
 Antena de Oro (2006), Te doy mi palabra.

TV

 Los Sabios (1983–1984) TVE.
 Tal Cual (TVE) (1989) TVE.
 3X4 (1989–1990) TVE.
 Arco de Triunfo (1991) TVE.
 Juegos sin fronteras (1991) TVE.
 Acompáñame (1992) TVE.
 Lo que necesitas es amor (1993–1994) Antena 3.
 Esta noche, sexo (1995) Antena 3.
 Hoy por ti (1996) Antena 3.
 Sorpresa ¡Sorpresa! (1996–1998) Antena 3.
 Hablemos claro (1999–2000) Canal Sur.
 Noche y día (2001) Antena 3.
 De buena mañana (2002) Antena 3.
 Hay una carta para ti (2002–2004) Antena 3.
 Sorpresa ¡Sorpresa! (2007) Antena 3.
 Cuéntaselo a Isabel (2008-2009) Canal Extremadura TV.
 Todos somos raros, todos somos únicos (2014) TVE.

Radio
Radio Extremadura
Radio Barcelona: La chica de la radio, Cita a las cinco,  El Diván...
Cadena Rato
Radio Nacional de España

References

External links
 Isabel Gemio in IMDb 

1961 births
Living people
People from Tierra de Badajoz
Spanish journalists
Spanish women journalists
Spanish people of Portuguese descent
Spanish television personalities
Spanish television presenters
Spanish women television presenters